Didier Bizimana (born 11 May 1975) is a Burundian retired  central defender who last played with SVN before in summer 2007 retired.

Career
He played for Rwandese side APR FC from 1995 to 2007, before moving to Dutch Tweede Klasse G team SVN.

International career
He was a member of the Burundi national football team and represented the Burundian U-20 at the 1995 FIFA World Youth Championship in Qatar, where he played in three games.

References

External links
 
 FIFA Profile

1975 births
Living people
Sportspeople from Bujumbura
Burundian footballers
Burundi international footballers
Association football defenders
Burundian expatriate sportspeople in Rwanda
Burundian expatriate sportspeople in the Netherlands
Burundian expatriate footballers
Expatriate footballers in Rwanda
APR F.C. players
Burundi under-20 international footballers